Lea Ackermann SMNDA (born February 2, 1937, in Völklingen) is a German nun, anti-prostitution activist and founder of the Solidarity with Women in Distress organisation. She has been the recipient of the Order of Merit of the Federal Republic of Germany in 1996, the Order of Merit of Rhineland-Palatinate in 2005, and the Bavarian Order of Merit in 2010.

References 

1937 births
Living people
German nuns
German activists